The 1903 Chicago Cubs season was the 32nd season of the Chicago Cubs franchise, the 28th in the National League, and the 11th at West Side Park. The Cubs finished third in the National League with a record of 82–56.

Regular season

Season standings

Record vs. opponents

Notable transactions 
 April 1903: Pop Williams was purchased from the Orphans by the Philadelphia Phillies.

Roster

Player stats

Batting

Starters by position 
Note: Pos = Position; G = Games played; AB = At bats; H = Hits; Avg. = Batting average; HR = Home runs; RBI = Runs batted in

Other batters 
Note: G = Games played; AB = At bats; H = Hits; Avg. = Batting average; HR = Home runs; RBI = Runs batted in

Pitching

Starting pitchers 
Note: G = Games pitched; IP = Innings pitched; W = Wins; L = Losses; ERA = Earned run average; SO = Strikeouts

Other pitchers 
Note: G = Games pitched; IP = Innings pitched; W = Wins; L = Losses; ERA = Earned run average; SO = Strikeouts

Notes

References 
1903 Chicago Cubs season at Baseball Reference

Chicago Cubs seasons
Chicago Cubs season
Chicago Cubs